The Third Street Bridge, also known as the Brookwood Park Bridge and the Harmon Street Bridge, is a historic structure located in Waverly, Iowa, United States. This Riveted Pratt through truss was designed by the Iowa State Highway Commission and constructed by the Illinois Steel Bridge Company of Jacksonville, Illinois in 1917. It is composed of three spans. The truss' were painted green in 1962, and the bridge received major renovations in 1983. It was closed to traffic in February 2015 "after a certified inspector examining the bridge Friday for an annual inspection found the trusses connecting bearings, sidewalk support brackets, and two stringers in the south bridge span have severely corroded." It was listed on the National Register of Historic Places in 2018. The Third Street Bridge is one of three bridges installed by the Illinois Steel Bridge Company that is still standing in Iowa.

References

Bridges completed in 1917
Buildings and structures in Bremer County, Iowa
National Register of Historic Places in Bremer County, Iowa
Road bridges on the National Register of Historic Places in Iowa
Pratt truss bridges in the United States
Waverly, Iowa